Sarkar 3 is a 2017 Indian Hindi-language political crime thriller film directed by Ram Gopal Varma. This is the third installment of the Sarkar franchise and the continuation to the events of Sarkar Raj. The film stars Amitabh Bachchan again in the titular lead role along with Jackie Shroff, Manoj Bajpayee, Amit Sadh, Yami Gautam, Ronit Roy and Parag Tyagi.

The film was released worldwide on 12 May 2017. The film deals with Sarkar's internal conflict and his palace-politics with top-level officials, and powerbrokers within the Maharashtra government, involving internal rivalry and intrigue. Amitabh Bachchan sang the Ganpati Arti track, and Marathi dialogues.

Plot
A businessman named Deven Gandhi (Bajrangbali Singh) approaches Subhash Nagre "Sarkar" (Amitabh Bachchan) for a real estate project over a large slum in Dharavi Mumbai. Sarkar suggests that Gandhi should offer appropriate compensation and relocate the slum dwellers. Gandhi deems that too expensive and would rather offer a smaller commission to Sarkar to force the relocation. Sarkar refuses and, when Gandhi insists that he will go to another power bastion, Sarkar asserts that he will not let Gandhi go ahead. Gandhi reports back to his Dubai-based boss Vallya (Jackie Shroff). They join hands with a rival opposition leader named Govind Deshpande (Manoj Bajpai) and plot to oust Sarkar.

Sarkar's wife (Supriya Pathak) pleads with him to permit their grandson Shivaji Nagre "Chiku" (Amit Sadh) to join him. Sarkar hesitates: the boy is hot-headed and volatile like his deceased father Vishnu Nagre, but ultimately lets him come. Chiku immediately clashes with Gokul (Sarkar's longtime loyal right-hand man) (Ronit Roy) over various matters including whether or not to eliminate Deshpande. It is implied that Chiku's girlfriend Annu (Yami Gautam) is using him to get to Sarkar because Sarkar had apparently ordered the elimination of her father. Meanwhile, Gandhi approaches Gokul with the proposition to help him or Chiku would become the next Sarkar and Gokul will remain a servant.

Deshpande plots with Gandhi and Vallya to instigate mill workers against Sarkar. Chikku is on the warpath to attack Deshpande. Sarkar tries to calculate who is behind everything. One day, Deshpande is hotly pursued and killed and Sarkar, who has long held a reputation for bumping the opposition, is blamed. Sarkar notes that whoever did this is determined and cunning and will stop at nothing. When assassins open fire on Sarkar at the Ganpati Visarjan festival, it becomes clear that Sarkar's inner circle has been breached. Chikku shows Sarkar the video of Gandhi meeting Gokul and, separately, Gokul remonstrates and says that Chiku, used by the wily Annu and his own vengeance for his father, is behind everything. Sarkar expels Chiku whereupon Chiku joins Gandhi.

Vallya orders a bomb blast at the mill. Gokul reports that it was executed by Chikku, who is now out to destroy Sarkar, and Gandhi. Around this time Sarkar's wife passes away, so Gokul beseeches Sarkar to give the order to kill Chikku. Chikku is shot at but he escapes. Gokul begins hunting him down.

Gokul is, presumably, shot dead by Chiku, and Sarkar swears vengeance. Vallya arrives in India to meet Sarkar. He points out that Chiku is too inexperienced to become Sarkar and is therefore useless, and offers to help Sarkar eliminate Chiku. Sarkar discloses that Chiku was dispatched to infiltrate Gandhi by none other than Sarkar himself. He, also, reveals that it was he who ordered Gokul's killing. Annu discovers that it was Gandhi who killed her father, not Sarkar, and she shoots him to death.

Hindsight reveals that; differences with Annu had been cleared and she was taken into confidence, and Gokul had turned to Gandhi and played a part in the mill agitation and the slum development in order to sideline Chiku, eventually hoping to become Sarkar. The objective of this hidden plan was to draw out Vallya. Chiku walks in,  there is a gunshot, and Vallya is killed. With their adversaries now dead, Sarkar and Chiku sip tea while Sarkar educates the inexperienced Chiku on palace politics.

Cast
 Amitabh Bachchan as Subhash Nagre (Sarkar)
 Jackie Shroff as Michael Vallya (Sir)
 Manoj Bajpayee as Govind Deshpande 
 Amit Sadh as Shivaji Nagre (Cheeku)
 Yami Gautam as Annu Karkare
 Fiza as Vallya's Girlfriend Theba
 Ronit Roy as Gokul Satam
 Parag Tyagi as Raman Guru 
 Bharat Dabholkar as Gorakh Rampur
 Rohini Hattangadi as Rukku Bai Devi
 Shiv Sharma as Mukul Shumpre
 Bajrangbali Singh as Deven Gandhi
Amal Sehrawat as Bhosle

Production
In 2009 Ram Gopal Varma stated that he had no plans finalised for the third instalment in the series and shelved Sarkar 3. However, in 2012 it was reported that the sequel would go ahead once again and currently is in the pre production stage where the script is being written. The film is expected to go on floors at the end of 2013, primarily with the same cast of Amitabh and Abhishek Bachchan although his character dies at the end of this film and also Aishwarya Rai is to be left out.

In August 2016 director Ram Gopal Varma confirmed Sarkar 3. He told on his Twitter that Abhishek and Aishwarya will not be a part of the third installment.

Soundtrack 
The soundtrack was released by Eros Now Music. The music has been composed by Rohan Vinayak and Ravi Shankar. The full soundtrack was released on 3 May 2017 and has seven songs.

References

External links
 

2017 films
Indian sequel films
Indian gangster films
Bal Thackeray
Indian crime drama films
Films set in Mumbai
Films shot in Dubai
2010s Marathi-language films
Indian multilingual films
Indian political thriller films
2010s political thriller films
2010s crime drama films
2010s Hindi-language films
2017 crime thriller films
Films about dysfunctional families
Films about organised crime in India
Films directed by Ram Gopal Varma
2017 drama films